Cannabis in the Central African Republic is illegal.

History
During the Central African Empire administration (1976–1979), production, possession, or sale of cannabis was illegal.

References

Central African Republic
Drugs in the Central African Republic